The Höfner 500/1 Violin Bass (sometimes nicknamed the "Beatle Bass" or "Cavern Bass") is a model of electric bass manufactured by Höfner under several varieties. It was introduced in 1955 and gained celebrity status during the 1960s as the primary bass used by Beatles bassist Paul McCartney.

History

In 1955, Walter Höfner designed an electrically amplified, semi-acoustic bass. The hollow body made this style of bass very light and easy to play, as well as giving it a rich tone similar to that of the traditional double bass. The bass was first shown to the public at the Frankfurt Music Fair in the spring of 1956. A major boost for the bass came in early 1961 when it caught the eye of a young Paul McCartney. In July 1961, before Stuart Sutcliffe decided to leave the Beatles, he briefly lent McCartney his bass until the latter could earn enough to buy a bass of his own in June 1961. McCartney was drawn to the Höfner because he felt that its symmetrical shape would mean that playing it left-handed would not look as awkward as using a cutaway guitar designed for a right-handed player: Following the popularity of the Violin Bass created by McCartney, Höfner began producing a similar alternative in terms of sound and size with a different shaped body called the Höfner 500/2 Club Bass in 1964.

Description
The Höfner 500 is a hollow-body instrument, though lacking soundholes, and is as such commonly referred to as a semi-hollow bass. It is built using a fairly traditional style, similar to that of an acoustic guitar. It commonly features a thin maple body, a spruce top and a maple neck. The fretboard is traditionally made of rosewood, though more contemporary models have utilized other, similar tonewoods. The Höfner 500 features a two-piece bridge system, consisting of an adjustable ebony bridge, and a metal tailpiece. The Höfner 500 is also notable for its distinctive control layout, featuring two rotary knobs, as well as three sliding knobs, controlling tone and pickup selection.

Earlier models, as well as certain reissues featured the two pickups spaced closely together, up against the heel of the neck, providing a fairly uniform tone, though most recent basses feature a more conventional "bridge/neck" pickup placement. The earlier models are often referred to as "Cavern basses", after the Cavern club, where Paul McCartney famously made use of this particular model.

"I remember going along there, and there was this bass which was quite cheap. I couldn't afford a Fender. Fenders even then seemed to be about £100. All I could really afford was about £30 ... so for about £30, I found this Hofner violin bass. And to me, it seemed like, because I was left-handed, it looked less daft because it was symmetrical. Didn't look as bad as a cutaway which was the wrong way. So I got into that."

McCartney eventually acquired two basses of this model: his original 1961 model, and a 1963 model. Afterward, McCartney mainly played the 1963 model, leaving the original as a backup. In 1964, he had his 1961 model refinished in sunburst and had a new updated pickup surround system installed around the original pickups, as one of the plastic original surrounds had snapped (the one nearer the neck). He can be seen using this bass in the "Revolution" promo video with the strap attached to the headstock instead of the neck heel, presumably to counteract the instrument's neck dive, which is caused by its light body. He continued to regularly use the violin bass until 1965 when he switched to a Rickenbacker 4001S; afterwards, he would rotate between the two. On 30 January 1969 the Höfner Bass made its last Beatle appearance at the Apple rooftop concert. Sometime during the recording of Let It Be, the 1961 model was stolen from Abbey Road Studios closet, along with George Harrison's Gretsch Tennessean and Rickenbacker 360/12. McCartney switched to using his 1963 model for the remainder of the album. He switched back to the Rickenbacker for the recording of Abbey Road and he even used it with Wings and his solo career. In 1988, while recording the Flowers in the Dirt album, a collaboration with Elvis Costello led to a request from Costello for McCartney to bring the 500/1 back from retirement. As of 2022, he is still in possession of the 1963 bass, and regularly uses it for performances.

Images

Variations

The following variations are or were sold by Höfner:

 500/1 Vintage '58 re-issue
 500/1 Vintage '59 re-issue
 500/1 Cavern Bass (no longer available from Höfner)
 500/1 Vintage '61 Cavern Bass (2011 model - based on Paul McCartney's original specs)
 500/1 Vintage '62 "Mersey"
 500/1 Vintage '62 50th Anniversary Edition (2014) of "The Ed Sullivan Show". Limited Edition of 64 only.
 500/1 Vintage '63 (no longer in production)
 500/1 Vintage '64 (replaced '63)
 500/1 125th Anniversary 'Black Violin Bass'
 5000/1 Deluxe Bass (no longer in production)
 500/1 KV 60th Anniversary model with graphics designed by Klaus Voormann
 H500/1-CT Contemporary Series ("Designed in Germany" printed on back of head. "Made in China" on sticker on back of head.) 
 Icon series B-Bass, made in China (name changed to Ignition for legal reasons in 2010)
 Höfner produced limited runs of the Icon B Bass in 5 custom color schemes. Only 150 of each color were manufactured and made available for sale in 2008.
 In 2008, the Icon B Bass was also issued in a limited edition "Dark Burst" finish, of which 88 were produced.
 HI series B-Bass (Ignition), made in Indonesia, from 2010. A cheaper budget option.

Imitators
Due to the cost of the official Höfner bass, several guitar companies offer more affordable versions of the "violin bass". These include Greco, Epiphone, Tokai, El Dégas, Jay Turser, Duesenberg, Rogue, Douglas, Harley Benton and Eko. These range anywhere from $200 to $1,500. Höfner themselves make an affordable version of their bass (the Ignition).

Höfner 500/1 players

 Paul McCartney
 Satomi Matsuzaki of Deerhoof
 Angel Deradoorian
 Nick Allbrook of Tame Impala
 Tom Hamilton of Aerosmith played a Höfner on the recording sessions for Just Push Play, and on the recording of "What It Takes".
 Robbie Shakespeare
 Chris Wood of Medeski Martin and Wood The Wood Brothers
 Yen Chih-Lin of Power Station
 Zach Dawes of The Last Shadow Puppets
 Charly Garcia in Random
 Doug Fieger of The Knack and Sky owned a Höfner.
Göran Lagerberg of Tages
Jon Anderson on Olias of Sunhillow

In popular culture

The Höfner 500/1 appeared in Guitar Hero II while the Epiphone Viola appeared in Guitar Hero: Aerosmith. A replica of the Höfner bass used by McCartney (albeit right-handed) is used as the basis for a guitar controller, included with the special edition bundle of the video game The Beatles: Rock Band.

References

Footnotes

External links

 Official Höfner website: A Short History of the Höfner 500/1 Violin Bass
 Detailed information on guitars used by The Beatles

Electric bass guitars
The Beatles' musical instruments